Luis Bareiro Spaini served as a Paraguayan Minister of National Defense under President Fernando Lugo until 2010. He is rumored to be planning a run for president.

References

Living people
Defence ministers of Paraguay
Year of birth missing (living people)